The 2003–04 Slovenian Football Cup was the 13th season of the Slovenian Football Cup, Slovenia's football knockout competition.

Qualified clubs

2002–03 Slovenian PrvaLiga members
Celje
Dravograd
Gorica
Koper
Ljubljana
Maribor
Mura
Olimpija
Primorje
Rudar Velenje
Šmartno

Qualified through MNZ Regional Cups
MNZ Ljubljana: Domžale, Bela Krajina, Factor
MNZ Maribor: Železničar Maribor, Fužinar, Paloma
MNZ Celje: Krško, Šoštanj
MNZ Koper: Izola, Jadran
MNZ Nova Gorica: Bilje, Brda
MNZ Murska Sobota: Bakovci, Cven
MNZ Lendava: Bistrica, Nafta Lendava
MNZG-Kranj: Jesenice, Šenčur
MNZ Ptuj: Drava Ptuj, Aluminij

First round

|}

Round of 16

|}

Quarter-finals

|}

Semi-finals

|}

Final

First leg

Second leg

References

Slovenian Football Cup seasons
Cup
Slovenian Cup